The North Irish Division, Royal Artillery, was an administrative grouping of garrison units of the Royal Artillery and Artillery Militia in Ireland from 1882 to 1889.

Organisation
Under General Order 72 of 4 April 1882 the Royal Artillery (RA) broke up its existing administrative brigades of garrison artillery (7th–11th Brigades, RA) and assigned the individual batteries to 11 new territorial divisions. These divisions were purely administrative and recruiting organisations, not field formations. For the first time the part-time Artillery Militia were associated with the regulars. The Regular Army batteries were grouped into one brigade, usually of nine sequentially-numbered batteries and a depot battery. For these units the divisions represented recruiting districts – batteries could be serving anywhere in the British Empire and their only connection to brigade headquarters (HQ) was for the supply of drafts and recruits. The artillery militia units (sometimes referred to as regiments) already comprised a number of batteries, and were redesignated as brigades, losing their county titles in the process.

Composition
North Irish Division, RA, listed as 10th in order of precedence, was organised with the following composition:

 HQ at Carrickfergus
 1st Brigade
 HQ at Derry
 1st Bty at Sandown, Isle of Wight – formerly 16th Bty, 11th Bde
 2nd Bty at Royal Artillery Barracks, Woolwich – formerly 5th Bty, 7th Bde
 3rd Bty at Portsmouth – formerly 15th Bty, 8th Bde
 4th Bty at Rangoon – formerly 9th Bty, 9th Bde
 5th Bty at Mhow – formerly 5th Bty, 11th Bde
 6th Bty at Gibraltar – formerly 18th Bty, 10th Bde
 7th Bty at Gibraltar – formerly 13th Bty, 10th Bde
 8th Bty at Gibraltar – formerly 14th Bty, 10th Bde
 9th Bty at Gibraltar – formerly 15th Bty, 10th Bde
 Depot Bty at Belfast – formerly Depot Bty, 3rd Bde
 2nd Brigade at Carrickfergus – formerly Antrim Artillery (8 btys)
 3rd Brigade at Letterkenny – formerly Donegal Artillery (6 btys)
 4th Brigade at Dublin – formerly Dublin City Artillery Militia (4 btys)
 5th Brigade at Galway – formerly Galway Artillery Militia (4 btys) – disbanded 1888
 6th Brigade at Dungannon – formerly Mid-Ulster Artillery Militia (5 btys)
 7th Brigade at Wicklow – formerly Wicklow Artillery Militia (4 btys)
 8th Brigade at Sligo – formerly Duke of Connaught's Own Sligo Artillery Militia (4 Btys)
 9th Brigade at Derry – formerly Londonderry Light Infantry Militia (6 Btys)

Disbandment
On 1 July 1889 the garrison artillery was reorganised again into three large territorial divisions of garrison artillery (Eastern, Southern and Western) and one of mountain artillery. The assignment of units to them seemed geographically arbitrary, with all the Irish militia units being grouped in the Southern Division, for example, but this related to where the need for coastal artillery was greatest, rather than where the units recruited. The regular batteries were distributed across most of the divisions and completely renumbered.

See also
 Royal Garrison Artillery
 List of Royal Artillery Divisions 1882–1902
 South Irish Division, Royal Artillery
 Southern Division, Royal Artillery

Footnotes

Notes

References
 J.B.M. Frederick, Lineage Book of British Land Forces 1660–1978, Vol II, Wakefield: Microform Academic, 1984, ISBN 1-85117-009-X.
 Lt-Gen H.G. Hart, The New Annual Army List, Militia List, Yeomanry Cavalry List and Indian Civil Service List for 1884, London: John Murray, 1883.
 Lt-Gen H.G. Hart, The New Annual Army List, Militia List, Yeomanry Cavalry List and Indian Civil Service List for 1890, London: John Murray, 1889.
 Lt-Col M.E.S. Lawes, Battery Records of the Royal Artillery, 1859–1877, Woolwich: Royal Artillery Institution, 1970.
 Norman E.H. Litchfield, The Militia Artillery 1852–1909 (Their Lineage, Uniforms and Badges), Nottingham: Sherwood Press, 1987, ISBN 0-9508205-1-2.
 Col K. W. Maurice-Jones, The History of Coast Artillery in the British Army, London: Royal Artillery Institution, 1959/Uckfield: Naval & Military Press, 2005, ISBN 978-1-845740-31-3.
 War Office, Monthly Army List, London: HM Stationery Office, 1882–89.

Royal Artillery divisions
Military units and formations established in 1882
Military units and formations disestablished in 1889